Javier Silvano Arce Arias (born 28 February 1957) is a Peruvian football manager, currently in charge of Carlos Stein.

Career
After beginning his career as a fitness coach, Arce was named manager of José Gálvez in March 2012, in the place of Wilmar Valencia. He then coached Defensor San Alejandro (two times), Unión Comercio (two times), UTC, Sport Loreto, Unión Huaral, Deportivo Garcilaso, Comerciantes Unidos, Binacional (two times), Cusco, Atlético Grau and Sport Huancayo. With Binacional he won the 2019 Apertura title.

References

External links

1957 births
Living people
People from Ica, Peru
Peruvian football managers
Peruvian Primera División managers
José Gálvez FBC managers
Deportivo Binacional FC managers
Sport Huancayo managers
Deportivo Garcilaso managers
Unión Comercio managers
Atlético Grau managers
Cusco FC managers
Universidad Técnica de Cajamarca managers